Łomża (seen without diacritics as Lomza) is a city in north-eastern Poland, approximately 150 kilometers (90 miles) to the north-east of Warsaw and  west of Białystok. It is situated alongside the Narew river as part of the Podlaskie Voivodeship since 1999. Previously, it was the capital of the Łomża Voivodeship from 1975 to 1998.  It is the capital of Łomża County and has been the seat of the Roman Catholic Diocese of Łomża since 1925.

Łomża is one of  the principal economic, educational, and cultural centres of north-eastern Masovia as well as one of the three main cities of Podlaskie Voivodeship (beside Białystok and Suwałki). It lends its name to the protected area of Łomża Landscape Park. The town is also the location of the Łomża Brewery.

History

Łomża was founded in the 10th century, on the site of the present day village called Stara Łomża (Old Łomża). It was first mentioned in official records in the 14th century. Łomża received its municipal rights in 1416, and became an important political and economic center in the mid-16th century. Łomża was a royal city of Poland and the capital of the Łomża Land, an administrative unit (ziemia) of the Masovian Voivodeship in the Greater Poland Province of the Polish Crown until Poland lost its independence in 1795.

Polish Duke Bolesław IV the Curly built a palace there in the 12th century. In 1444 the town was granted an exemption from the transit tax on Narew river contributing to its further development. In the 16th century King Sigismund II Augustus gave Łomża the right to hold great fairs three times a year, similar to Warsaw and Płock. In 1614 the Jesuits founded a Jesuit College, which as today's I Liceum Ogólnokształcące is among the oldest high schools in Poland. In 1618 a great fire destroyed most of the city, and six years later, an epidemic killed 5,021 persons decimating its population. A series of disasters (including the Swedish invasion and the Cossack raids) resulted in its rapid decline.

As a result of the Partitions of Poland Łomża was annexed by Prussia in 1795. In 1807 it was included in the short-lived Polish Duchy of Warsaw, within which it was the seat of the Łomża Department. In 1815 Łomża became part of Congress Poland, which was forcibly integrated into the Russian Empire over the course of the 19th century. After the Russian massacres of Polish protesters in Warsaw in 1861, Polish demonstrations took place in Łomża, at which even romantic poet Władysław Syrokomla gave a public speech, however, they ended in October 1861 when the Russians imposed martial law. Afterwards the Polish resistance began preparations for an uprising. In 1863 the January Uprising broke out and many local Poles joined it. In July 1863, the Russians carried out a massacre of 50 unarmed young Poles in the nearby forest in Wygoda, mainly students of local schools, who joined the uprising. The victims were tortured and murdered in gruesome ways: some had their eyes gouged out, bones broken, or insides torn out before they died. From November 1863, the Russians carried out mass arrests and confiscations of Polish property, and many insurgents escaped from the country. Russians deported hundreds of Poles from the county to Katorga to Siberia, and Łomża was one of the sites of Russian executions of Polish insurgents. At the place of the executions, Poles put up crosses several times, and the Russians removed them.

During World War I, the Russian administration was evacuated in June 1915, and the city was occupied by Germany from August 1915 until 1918. In 1916 the Poles finally erected a still preserved monument at the site of the Russian executions of Polish insurgents. In 1916–1917, the Polish Legions were stationed in the city. In 1917–1918, Łomża was the location of a German internment camp for soldiers of the Polish Legions. In November 1918, Poland regained independence, and the occupying German forces opened fire on Poles who tried to liberate the city, but it was still reintegrated with the reborn Polish state.

During the Polish-Soviet War of 1919–1921, the city was attacked by the Russians on July 29, 1920, and then it was defended by the Poles for a week. Łomża was directly in the path of the Russian army's catastrophic retreat following its defeat at the Battle of Warsaw. On August 15, 1920, the Soviet General August Kork of the 15th Army mounted an unsuccessful defence of the town against the Polish Fourth Army of General Leonard Skierski, before continuing its retreat eastward under pressure from the Polish forces.

World War II

In September 1939, during the joint Soviet and German invasion of Poland, Łomża was largely destroyed by the Wehrmacht during the Battle of Łomża, and then was briefly occupied by Germany. The Einsatzgruppe V entered Łomża in mid-September to commit various crimes against Poles. Germans carried out searches of Polish offices, organizations, and Catholic institutions, including the bishop's seat and the Capuchin monastery, and banned preaching and the organization of meetings.

On September 26, 1939, a Soviet aircraft dropped anti-Polish propaganda leaflets, which stated that "Poles are not capable of self-governing their country," so "the Soviets come to take care of them out of mercy." Soon afterwards the city was turned over by the Germans to the Red Army, which entered on September 29. The Soviets established a local station of the NKVD, and the Polish population was subjected to various repressions. In January 1940, the Soviets changed several street names, even calling one September 17 Street, after the day of the Soviet invasion of Poland. At least 32 Poles from Łomża were murdered by the Russians in the Katyn massacre in 1940. The Soviets carried out arrests of the Capuchin monks and expelled Benedictine nuns in mid-1940. According to Soviet data from September 1940, over 330 Polish families were deported from the district to the USSR. In 1941 the local Polish underground resistance movement was weakened when the Soviets arrested its commander. The Soviets held 2,128 people in the local prison as of June 21, 1941, the day before Germany invaded the Soviet Union, and on June 20–21 they carried out mass deportations of Poles to Russia. Łomża remained under Soviet control until Operation Barbarossa.

In June 1941, at the onset of the Russian campaign Łomża was captured by the Wehrmacht and used as a communications hub by the German forces. Hundreds of Poles, including those initially held in the local prison and local Polish intelligentsia, were murdered in large massacres in nearby villages of Sławiec, Jeziorko and Pniewo in 1942–1943. The Jewish population of Łomża, which numbered 9,000 at the beginning of the war, was almost entirely wiped out, murdered at a nearby forest or sent to the Auschwitz concentration camp to be murdered there. Only a few dozen survived. Since 1943, the Sicherheitspolizei carried out deportations of Poles including teenage boys from the local prison to the Stutthof concentration camp.

The Red Army fought back and successfully captured Łomża on September 13, 1944. Afterwards the city was restored to Poland.

Recent period
Between 1946 and 1975, the oldest part of the city was rebuilt. New housing estates came into existence along with several industrial plants, among them Łomża cotton and furniture factories and starch manufacturer PEPEES, as well as municipal thermal power station. The city transit system was also established during this time. By the beginning of the 1970s, the population had reached almost 30,000 inhabitants.

Jewish community
References to Jewish residents in Łomża date to 1494. The population numbers date back only to 1808, when 157 Jews were officially counted. A magnificent stone synagogue was built there in 1881 on the initiative of Rabbi Eliezer-Simcha Rabinowicz. The Great Synagogue designed by Enrico Marconi became a centre of the Zionist movement. The Lomza Yeshiva attracted hundreds of Orthodox Jewish students, founded in 1883.  In 1931, there were 8,912 Jews who lived in the city.

World War I was especially hard on the Jewish community of Łomża, which was a major battle area against German military forces. In 1915, the Jewish Aid Society estimated that 22,000 Jewish residents of Łomża were made homeless from the war.

On October 29, 1941, German troops forced over 1,000 Jewish residents of Lomza to kneel in trenches, and they murdered them all with machine guns. They continued murdering entire families.

On 12 August 1941, a Łomża Ghetto was created in the vicinity of the Old Market Square (Stary Rynek). The Nazi Einsatzkommando under SS-Obersturmführer Hermann Schaper committed mass killings of alleged Soviet collaborators a few days later. The number of Jews herded into the Łomża Ghetto from surrounding villages and towns including Jedwabne, Stawiski, Piątnica, Rotki, Wizna, Łomża, and others, ranged from 10,000 to 18,000. Over two-thousand people were murdered in the Giełczyn Forest outside of town. Many Jews perished from malnutrition and diseases such as dysentery and typhus. The rest were shipped to Auschwitz. The Łomża synagogue was destroyed. The ghetto was liquidated in the final deportation action on 1 November 1942. Only a small number of the Jews of Łomża survived the Holocaust; some found refuge with Catholic Polish families.

At the end of 1944, the Red Army recaptured the territory. Following the Yalta Conference, the Soviets ceded the city to Poland, with its total population reduced to 12,500 inhabitants, none of whom were Jewish.

One of the only visible remnants of the city's Jewish history is the Jewish cemetery. In 1999, the Lomza Jewish Cemetery Foundation was officially founded as a charity devoted to restoring the cemetery, showing respect to the deceased buried there, and to improve relations between Poles and Jews. Łomża declared the Jewish cemetery to be historical sites, and the city erected signed warning that any damage caused would be punishable under the Historical Site Preservation Law. The city also decided to install doors and replace the roof on one of the original cemetery's buildings.

In the 1997, a Torah was discovered that had been hidden in a home in Łomża since World War II. The Torah was discovered while the home was being razed to build new housing. The Torah was bought by Gerald C. Bender, a man living in Illinois in the United States whose father had been born and raised in Łomża. Bender bought the Torah in order to donate it to a synagogue.

Demographics

Łomża is the third largest city in Podlaskie Voivodeship with 62,019 inhabitants as of 2021. At the end of 2006, the population growth was positive and amounted to 1.3% per 1000 inhabitants whereas the balance of migration was negative (-520). The unemployment rate in May 2008 amounted to 10,2%. According to data from 2006, an average income per inhabitant amounted to 2,942.31 zł.

Historical population of Łomża, 1808 – 1931
General population in blue. Number of Poles of Jewish faith in green. Source: Qiryat Tiv'on, Israel.

Religion
The inhabitants of Łomża are predominantly Roman Catholic, although over the centuries in addition to the Catholics, followers of other religions have settled there. There is evidence of many Jewish and Protestant gravestones at the Łomża cemeteries, particularly the two abandoned Jewish cemeteries.

Education
The history of education in Łomża dates back to the early 15th century, when the first parish was founded. In 1614, Jesuits residing in Łomża created a Collegium (present-day I Liceum Ogólnokształcące im. Tadeusza Kościuszki). One of its rectors was Andrew Bobola. The educational level has not decreased after the KEN school pijarom in 1774. Łomża has educated a number of dignitaries, among others: Szymon Konarski, Rafał Krajewski, Jakub Ignacy Weight, Wojciech Szweykowski, and Adam Chętnik.

Currently in Łomża there is a well-developed network of public and private schools at all levels. There are seven primary schools, eight schools, ten secondary schools, six universities (including three non-public) and two schools of art. The educational level in Łomża is high, based on the results of the exams and countrywide lists. For example, I Liceum Ogólnokształcące rates as a top national and central Poland school.

Economy

The economy of Łomża is closely connected to its natural environment, with agricultural and forestry industries at the forefront of the region's economic development. The economy is ecologically friendly, including the food industries, brewing, electronics, the manufacture of building materials and furniture, the production and processing of agricultural crops, as well as tourism and agro-tourism. 
Even the largest companies employ less than 1,000 workers, even though a number of firms are listed on the Podlasie Top One Hundred Entrepreneurs. Among them, the Łomża Brewery (large scale producer of beer), DOMEL (producer of unleaded windows), FARGOTEX (importer of upholstery fabrics), Konrad (importer of farm animals), Łomża furniture factory (Łomżyńska Fabryka Mebli), PEPEES (producer of potato starch), Purzeczko (the personal and property protection). On top of that, the city is a registered office of the Podlasie Agency for Restructuring and Modernisation of Agriculture.

By the end of 2007, the number of people steadily employed in Łomża was 13,408, including 7,170 women, however, the unemployment rate remained considerably high at 14.1 percent. The number of businesses registered by the end of 2008 was 6,421 of which 6,280 belonged to the private sector.

Sports

The history of sport in Łomża dates back to the end of the 19th century, when the first amateur races were held in 1897. Two years later, Łomża Rowing Society was established, and initiated its activities on January 26, 1902.

The first football club was founded on April 16, 1926, currently known as ŁKS Łomża. It is the city's most successful football club, having played on the Polish second tier in the 1930s, 1940s, and 2000s.

There are several sports clubs in town including volleyball, basketball, athletics, and martial arts. The inhabitants of the town have been the most successful in athletics, sports fighting and bodybuilding. Sports in Łomża are supported by the Society for Promoting Physical Culture and the Łomża School Sports Association. In 1998, an indoor sports arena opened for national and international sporting events, including indoor football matches and martial arts tournaments.

In 2009, a contract was signed for the construction of a municipal swimming pool to open in 2011, which is the second such facility in the city.

Landmarks

Notable people

 Hanka Bielicka (1915–2006), Polish actress
 Andrew Bobola (1591–1657), Polish Roman Catholic saint
 Yehoshua Leib Diskin (1818–1898), rabbi
 Julita Fabiszewska (born 1991), Polish singer/songwriter; participant in Bitwa na głos.
 Yitzhak HaLevi Herzog (1888–1959), Chief Rabbi of Israel and father of Chaim Herzog, 6th President of Israel
 Adam Kownacki (born 1989), Polish Heavyweight boxer
 Samuel A. Levine (1891–1966), American cardiologist
 Michał Piaszczyński (1885–1940), Polish Catholic priest, killed by the German Nazis
 Rajmund Rembieliński (1774–1841), Polish nobleman, activist and landowner

See also
 Łomża Landscape Park
 List of cities in Poland

References

External links

 
 Łomża City in old documents
 Historical Łomża
 Łomża City in "Geographical Dictionary of Polish Kingdom and other Slavic countries, Vth volume" p. 699-704
 The website about monuments in Łomża
 
 Water Tower Sikorskiego street
 

 
Cities and towns in Podlaskie Voivodeship
City counties of Poland
Masovian Voivodeship (1526–1795)
Łomża Governorate
Białystok Voivodeship (1919–1939)
Warsaw Voivodeship (1919–1939)
Belastok Region
Holocaust locations in Poland